National nature reserves in Derbyshire, England, are established by Natural England, and managed by them or by non-governmental organisations including the National Trust.

List of reserves:

 Calke Park NNR
 Derbyshire Dales National Nature Reserve
 Dovedale
 Kinder Scout NNR

Other national nature reserves all over England:
National nature reserves in England
Natural England

References

 Derbyshire
Nature reserves in Derbyshire